This is an overview of the 2012 Iranian legislative election in Tehran, Rey, Shemiranat and Eslamshahr electoral district.

Results

First round

Second round

Notes and references

Parliamentary elections in Tehran
2010s in Tehran
2012 elections in Iran